The Waldron Health Centre is a National Health Service (NHS) building next to New Cross railway station in Lewisham, South London, England. It was completed in phases, with the health centre finished in 2008 and final construction ending in 2010.

Construction

The Waldron building project had a budget of £13.4m.

The Project Architect was Craig Linnell of Henley, Halebrown and Rorrison. The Services Engineering company was Ramboll.

Construction began in 2006, with the project divided into phases. Phases I and II, which comprise the health center and some retail units, were completed in 2008. Phase III, with housing and more retail, was completed in 2010.

Use

It is occupied by the Amersham Vale Training Practice, Clifton Rise Family Practice, and the New Cross Health Centre.

See also
 Healthcare in London

References

External links 
 Website: http://www.hhbr.co.uk/projects/urban/002.htm

Buildings and structures in the London Borough of Lewisham
Health in London
General practice